Double Jeopardy is a 1992 television thriller film  directed  by  Lawrence Schiller and starring Rachel Ward and Bruce Boxleitner.

Plot
Jack Hart lives with his lawyer wife and young daughter and enjoys a wonderful life. Jack's old girlfriend, Lisa, comes into town and they have an affair. Lisa kills her current boyfriend in self-defense and Jack witnesses the whole thing. Lisa goes on trial for murder with Jack's wife as her lawyer. As the movie progresses, Lisa's devious side becomes known. Jack is fired from his job because of the scandal. Lisa has a dark side which is discovered but she can not be re-tried for murder when she was really guilty. Jack re-plays the staged crime in his head and figures out that he was set up and the rape was staged. Lisa sets out to climb the devils needle. Jack and Lisa climb the rock by hand, but Lisa falls and hits her head and dangles in mid air. Police show up and you see a yellow tarp covering the dead body of Lisa. Jack's wife finds a map in the trash and drives out to see him. The movie ends with them looking at each other from a distance.

Cast

 Rachel Ward as Lisa Burns Donnelly 
 Bruce Boxleitner as  Jack Hart 
 Sela Ward as  Karen Hart 
 Sally Kirkland as  Detective Phyllis Camden 
 Jay Patterson as  Assistant District Attorney
 Denice Duff as Shelley Conoway
 Tom Everett as Frank Jameson 
 Aaron Eckhart as  Dwayne

Production
Parts of the film were shot in Salt Lake City, Highway 279, Rainbow Rocks and Tombstone Butte in Utah.

References

External links
 
 

1992 television films
1992 films
1992 thriller films
Films directed by Lawrence Schiller
Films scored by Eduard Artemyev
Films shot in Utah
American thriller television films
Showtime (TV network) films
1990s English-language films
1990s American films